The Institut National des Sciences Appliquées de Rennes or INSA Rennes is a Grande École d'Ingénieurs, a School of Engineering, under the authority of the French Ministry of Education and Research.

It is located on the Beaulieu campus in the east of Rennes, it is a part of the INSA group, which trains nearly 12% of all French engineers each year. Founded in 1966 to train highly qualified engineers, support continuing education, and conduct research and testing, it is the biggest engineering school in the region of Brittany. The five-year curriculum aims at training engineers who possess humane qualities and are well versed in the primary areas of science and engineering. The school accommodates 1,400 students in engineering.

The 5-year education is divided into two parts:
 the first cycle, a highly selective part of the studies which aims at giving the basis for future engineering studies that takes 2 years
 the second cycle, where the students have 7 specialties to choose from and will study their choice of specialty for 3 more years

First cycle
The five year academic curriculum starts with a foundation course (preparatory cycle) where students focus on fundamental sciences (maths, physics, chemistry, mechanics and computer sciences) and then progressively concentrate on specialized areas in science and technology. This generalist preparatory cycle ensures that all INSA engineers acquire a solid background in terms of skills and competence, thus allowing them to reorient their career independently of their initial specialization. The first cycle is the highly selective part of the studies. During the first year the examinations are very hard to test if students are able to continue with their engineering studies.

Some special sections are available :

 Filière Internationale (International branch): only for the first cycle, the international branch consists of approximately 100 students, made up with around half of them French students and other half coming from non-French speaking country, mainly Turkey, China, and Vietnam.
 Filière INSA - Sciences Po Rennes: partnership with Rennes Institute of Political Studies (also known as Sciences Po Rennes), aiming to train high-level executives capable of working in both engineering and governance.
 Filière Arts - Études (Art-with-studies branch): provides 4 sub-branches of studies: music, plastic arts, theatre, and lighting.
 Filière Excellence Sportive (Sporting excellence branch): combines engineering training with high-level sport, aimed for student who are high-level athletes registered on the lists of the Ministry of Sports and national-level athletes.

Second cycle 
The second cycle offers 7 different engineering specialties:
 Computer Science
 Mechanical Engineering and Automatism
 Civil Engineering
 Electronics and Computer Engineering
 Materials Science & Engineering
 Communication Systems & Networks
 Mathematical Engineering

Student life
The school is located on the Beaulieu campus, served by multiple bus routes and the soon opening metro line B. 

The 17-hectare campus of INSA Rennes includes:

 Four residential buildings (820 rooms and 171 studios) with Internet access
 A restaurant (serving breakfast, lunch and dinner)
 A library
 A multimedia centre with 100 freely accessible workstations, connected to the Internet and providing access to many hardware and software resources
 A student bar, with a capacity of 800 places
 A student cafeteria
 The "Halle Francis Querné", a general-purpose sports hall with a floor space of approximately 2,000 m²

Associations
 AEIR - INSA Rennes Engineering Students Association
With a 900-strong membership, the AEIR offers students a wide range of sports, leisure and cultural activities 
 AS (Association Sportive)
The AS offers students the opportunity to partake in organised sports events and other sporting activities of a more or less competitive nature.
 Ouest INSA – Junior Entreprise
Students get involved in the business world.
 FSIR – Formula Student INSA Rennes
Their aim is to take part in the worldwide Formula Student challenge and design, conceive and build a single-seat racing car.
 Forum Synergie Ouest
FSO is an association which gets students in touch with companies based in the West of France. 
 EAI – Echange Afrique-INSA
The EAI carries out numerous aid projects in developing countries (construction of schools, etc.). 
 Association 1,2,3,4 L
A gateway to participating in the humanitarian "4L Trophy" for 4L Citroën cars. Teams carry aid parcels destined for people in need in Africa. 
...

Annual events
 WEIPA & WEI (September)
WEIPA is the freshers’ welcoming week. As its name implies, it is not a question of ragging the newcomers, but of getting to know the 1st year students in a good-humoured festive atmosphere.
WEI is also a welcoming week but intended for freshmen entering directly in the 3rd year, part of the studies known as the engineering studies. The first two years being a preparatory time.
 Festival de l'Oeil Glauque (October)
Festival de l'oeil glauque (English: Festival of the squalid eye) is a role playing convention running each year. Board games and roleplaying games are available to players.
 Forum du Grand Ouest (November)
This recruitment fair is an essential opportunity for meetings between students and industry (60 companies and 2500 students). 
 The Gala (November)
Students look their smartest for the grandest of evenings that is Gala Night. Entertainment is provided by live bands and a variety of stage acts with refreshments available in the theme-bar hall. 
 InsaLan (February)
A LAN Party where more than 400 players gathers around several competitive games. The event also have a public part, where visitors can participate in retrogaming, watch streams and enjoy the show.
 “Un des sens” (March)
A multicultural festival based on the many interpretations of the word “sens”. This festival offers a rich and varied programme with the objective of promoting freedom of artistic expression. 
 Rock'n solex: 
Oldest French student festival and the 2nd largest music festival in Rennes with more than 30 000 visitors each year.

Notable students
 Nguyễn Tiến Trung, Vietnamese cyber-dissident (graduated in 2007)
 Jérémy Roy, cyclist (graduated in 2007)
 Armel Le Cléac'h, professional navigator and sea captain, IMOCA world champion in 2008
 Sylvie Thiébaux, French-Australian computer scientist (graduated in 1991)

References

External links
 INSA Rennes
 INSA's Junior-Enterprise
 Formula Student of INSA Rennes
 Robotics' Club of INSA Rennes
 Humanitarian Association of INSA Rennes
 360° View of INSA Rennes Campus

Education in Rennes
Grandes écoles
Educational institutions established in 1966
1966 establishments in France